Founded in 1967, Inquilinos Boricuas en Acción (IBA) is a community development corporation whose goal is to make sure the residents of Villa Victoria in South End, Boston keep long term control over their housing and neighborhood. They offer many programs for community development and organization, such as art, culture, and human services for the neighborhood. They hope to empower the growing Latino community in Boston's South End, most notably the Villa Victoria section.

History 
IBA began in South End, Boston as a grassroots movement to fight the Boston Redevelopment Authority's urban renewal plan. In 1968, a year after forming the IBA, they had established their own housing plan given to the Boston Housing Authority and renamed themselves the "Emergency Tenants Council." A year later, they were given the rights to develop on the parcel of land that is now Villa Victoria, and changed their name to "Inquilinos Boricuas en Acción", or "Puerto Rican Tenants in Action". This was considered a large accomplishment in terms of affordable housing, community organizing, and civil rights as they gave birth to a new community of not only Puerto Rican tenants, but Latinos of all cultures.

Mission 
The goal of IBA is to empower to the residents of the neighborhood through arts, education, workforce development, and affordable housing communities that are vibrant and brightly colored to liven up the neighborhood. IBA aims to preserve safe and culturally diverse housing communities so the members are able to reach their full social, economic, or political potential. In order to achieve these goals, the group lives by a few different rules. They look for community involvement and direct representation, great leadership and planning, reinforcement of cultural pride, and effective organization around community needs. IBA uses these guidelines to go about their business.

Villa Victoria 

Thought to be one of the major accomplishments in Boston's urban housing developments, Villa Victoria, or Victory Village, is located in Boston's growing South End neighborhood. It is a housing community that contains 435 low income housing units, as well as various commercial and community spaces such as restaurants, community centers, markets, and retail stores. The development was done by 1976 in four different phases; Victoria Apartments, Viviendas Apartments, South End Apartments, and Casas Borinquen Apartments. The properties in Villa Victoria have been renovated in the past ten years using funds from the Low-Income Housing Tax Credit program and the Section 8 Mark Up To Market program.

Programs

Education 
 Preschool
 After School & Summer Learning Program
 Youth Development Program

Economic Development 
 College and Workforce Development Program
 Resident Services Program
 Sustainable Housing Communities

Technology & Arts 
 Community Technology Center
 IBA Arts Program

References

Further reading
 

Non-profit organizations based in Boston
Community-building organizations
Affordable housing advocacy organizations
Organizations established in 1967
South End, Boston
Housing in Massachusetts